That's How I Love the Blues! is an album by American jazz vocalist Mark Murphy featuring tracks recorded in late 1962 for the Riverside label.

Reception

Allmusic awarded the album 4½ stars with the review by Scott Yanow stating, "Murphy is in top early form".

Track listing
 "Going to Chicago Blues" (Count Basie, Jimmy Rushing) - 4:14  
 "Señor Blues" (Horace Silver) - 2:27  
 "That's How I Love the Blues" (Ralph Blane, Hugh Martin) - 3:47  
 "Jelly Jelly Blues" (Billy Eckstine, Earl Hines) - 3:25  
 "(I'm Left with The) Blues in My Heart" (Benny Carter, Irving Mills) - 2:13  
 "Fiesta in Blue" (Benny Goodman, Jon Hendricks, Dave Lambert, Jimmy Mundy) - 3:13  
 "Rusty Dusty Blues" (J. Mayo Williams) - 2:05  
 "Blues in the Night" (Harold Arlen, Johnny Mercer) - 3:39  
 "The Meaning of the Blues" (Bobby Troup, Leah Worth) - 2:52  
 "Everybody's Crazy 'Bout the Doggone Blues" (Henry Creamer, Turner Layton) - 2:25  
 "Blues, You're the Mother of Sin" (Billy Eckstine, Sid Kuller) - 3:19  
 "Wee Baby Blues" (Pete Johnson, Big Joe Turner) - 5:17

Personnel 
Mark Murphy - vocals
Clark Terry, Nick Travis, Snooky Young - trumpet 
Roger Kellaway - piano
Dick Hyman, Bernie Leighton - organ
Jim Hall - guitar 
Ben Tucker - bass
Dave Bailey - drums
Willie Rodriguez - congas, timpani
Al Cohn - arranger

References 

1963 albums
Mark Murphy (singer) albums
Albums produced by Orrin Keepnews
Riverside Records albums